Chisocheton lansiifolius is a tree in the family Meliaceae. The specific epithet  is from the Latin, meaning leaves resembling those of  the genus Lansium, specifically Lansium parasiticum.

Description
The bark is dark brown. The flowers are creamy-white to pinkish.

Distribution and habitat
Chisocheton lansiifolius is endemic to Borneo. Its habitat is rain  forests, including peatswamp forests, from sea-level to  altitude.

References

lansiifolius
Endemic flora of Borneo
Trees of Borneo
Plants described in 1979